Staunton Hill is a historic plantation house located in Charlotte County, Virginia; the nearest community is Brookneal, which is in Campbell County. It was built in 1848 by Charles Bruce (father of Sen. William Cabell Bruce), and is a two-story, five bay, brick dwelling in the Gothic Revival style. It features a three-story projecting entrance tower at the center bay with Gothic arch windows. It also features a crenelated parapet and turrets.

It was listed on the National Register of Historic Places in 1969.

References

External links

 Staunton Hill, State Route 619, Brookneal, Campbell County, VA at the Historic American Buildings Survey (HABS)
 Staunton Hill, Homes and Gardens in Old Virginia c1931

Plantation houses in Virginia
Houses on the National Register of Historic Places in Virginia
Gothic Revival architecture in Virginia
Houses completed in 1848
Houses in Charlotte County, Virginia
National Register of Historic Places in Charlotte County, Virginia
Historic American Buildings Survey in Virginia